Filip Najdovski (born 13 September 1992) is a Macedonian footballer who plays for Albanian club KF Tirana as both a defender/midfielder.

Tirana
Najdovski joined Albanian club and Kategoria Superiore champions KF Tirana on 12 August 2020 on a free transfer, immediately joining the rest of the squad at their pre-season training camp in Pogradec

Honours
Vardar
 Macedonian First Football League: 2019–20

Tirana
 Kategoria Superiore: 2021–22
 Albanian Supercup:2022

References

1992 births
Living people
Footballers from Skopje
Association football fullbacks
Association football central defenders
Macedonian footballers
North Macedonia youth international footballers
North Macedonia under-21 international footballers
FK Cementarnica 55 players
FK Napredok players
FK Teteks players
FK Pobeda players
FK Vardar players
KF Tirana players
Macedonian First Football League players
Kategoria Superiore players
Expatriate footballers in Albania
Macedonian expatriate sportspeople in Albania
Macedonian expatriate footballers